First Experience is the second album by Hong Kong singer Jason Chan released in 2009.

Track listing

References

2008 albums
Jason Chan (singer) albums